Two separate types of diesel locomotive operating in Great Britain have been given the TOPS classification Class 21.
British Rail Class 21 (NBL) - a class of 58 diesel-electric locomotives produced by the North British Locomotive Company from 1958-1960.
British Rail Class 21 (MaK) - a group of diesel-hydraulic locomotives produced by MaK/Vossloh and used on the Channel Tunnel Rail Link.

21 0